Buses have been used as a mode of public transport in London since 1829, when George Shillibeer started operating a horse-drawn omnibus service from Paddington to the City of London. In the decades since their introduction, the red London bus has become a symbol of the city.

, London has 675 bus routes served by over 8,700 buses, almost all of which are operated by private companies under contract to (and regulated by) London Buses, part of the publicly-owned Transport for London. Over 800 buses in the fleet are battery electric and hydrogen fuel cell buses, the 2nd largest zero emission bus fleet in Europe (behind Moscow). In 2006, London became one of the first major cities in the world to have an accessible, low floor bus fleet.

History 

Buses have been used on the streets of London since 1829, when George Shillibeer started operating his horse-drawn omnibus service from Paddington to the City. In 1850, Thomas Tilling started horse bus services, and in 1855 the London General Omnibus Company (LGOC) was founded to amalgamate and regulate the horse-drawn omnibus services then operating in London.

The LGOC began using motor omnibuses in 1902, and manufactured them itself from 1909. In 1904, Thomas Tilling started its first motor bus service. The last LGOC horse-drawn bus ran on 25 October 1911, although independent operators used them until 1914.

In 1909, Thomas Tilling and the LGOC entered into an agreement to pool their resources. The agreement restricted the expansion of Thomas Tilling in London, and allowed the LGOC to lead an amalgamation of most of London's bus services. However, also in 1909, Thomas Clarkson started the National Steam Car Company to run steam buses in London in competition with the LGOC. In 1919, the National company reached agreement with the LGOC to withdraw from bus operation in London, and steam bus services ceased later that year.

London Passenger Transport Board to London Regional Transport 

In 1912, the Underground Electric Railways Company of London (UERL), which at that time owned most of the London Underground, bought the LGOC. In 1933, the LGOC, along with the rest of the UERL, became part of the new London Passenger Transport Board (LPTB). The name London General was replaced by London Transport, which became synonymous with the red London bus.

Bus numbers were first used in 1906. When the independent firms started in 1922, they used General route numbers, along with alphabetical suffixes to denote branch routes. In 1924, under the London Traffic Act, the Metropolitan Police was authorised to allocate route numbers, which all buses had to carry. This ultimately led to chaos, and in the London Passenger Transport Act 1933 the power to allocate route numbers was taken away from the police and handed once again to professional busmen. Suffixes were gradually abolished over the decades, the last such route in London being the 77A, which became the 87 in June 2006.

The LPTB, under Lord Ashfield, assumed responsibility for all bus services in the London Passenger Transport Area, an area with a radius of about 30 miles from Central London. This included the London General country buses (later to be London Transport's green buses), Green Line Coaches and the services of several Tilling Group and independent companies.

London buses continued to operate under the London Transport name from 1933 to 2000, although the political management of transport services changed several times. The LPTB oversaw transport from 1933 to 1947, when it was nationalised and became the London Transport Executive (1948 to 1962). The responsible authority for London Transport was then successively the London Transport Board (1963 to 1969), the Greater London Council (1970 to 1984) and London Regional Transport (1984 to 2000). However, in 1969, a new law transferred the green country services, outside the area of the Greater London Council, to the recently formed National Bus Company. Trading under the name London Country, the green buses and Green Line Coaches became the responsibility of a new NBC subsidiary, London Country Bus Services, on 1 January 1970.

Despite a comprehensive replacement of the bus fleet in the early 1950s, bus ridership fell dramatically - from 4.5 billion in 1950, to 3.1 billion by 1962 - while private car ownership rapidly increased. A seven day strike in 1958 and a fall in London's population by over a million people exacerbated the fall in ridership.

A former network of express buses operated by London Transport in Central London was the Red Arrows. The routes, all numbered in the 500s, ran from main line stations to various locations in the West End and City. They were introduced in 1966 and expanded in 1968, but in the 1990s they were gradually phased out and only two former routes, 507 and 521, remain.

In 1974, Jill Viner became the first female bus driver for London Transport.

In 1979, the operation of London's buses under the GLC was divided among eight areas or districts:

The districts were later reorganised and reduced to six (with the abolition of Tower and Watling), and, following the Transport Act of 1985, were done away with in 1989 with privatisation imminent.

Privatisation 

In the 1980s the government of Margaret Thatcher decided to privatise the bus operating industry in the Great Britain. At the time, local bus transport was dominated by London Transport in London, and in other major cities by large municipally owned operators, as well as by the government-owned National Bus Company and Scottish Bus Group elsewhere. The Transport Act 1985 brought about bus deregulation throughout Great Britain which opened up local bus operation to private operators and required municipal companies to operate independently of local government on a commercial basis.

However, the Transport Act 1985 did not apply in London - instead, the London Regional Transport Act 1984 required that an arms-length subsidiary company of London Transport called London Buses to be set up. London Buses would specify details of routes, fares and services levels, and the running of bus services would be contracted to private companies on a tendered basis. From 1985, bus routes were gradually tendered out to private companies, with London Buses split into business units from 1989. Controversially, private operators were allowed to run buses in colours other than the traditional red. Following a campaign by tourism groups, tender specifications since 1997 specify that buses in London be 80% red.

Despite proposals from the Government in the 1990s to deregulate bus routes in London, the bus tendering regime is still in place today, with individual bus routes put out to competitive tendering by private companies.

Growth 
In 2000, as part of the formation of the new Greater London Authority, the management of buses in London moved from the central government controlled London Regional Transport to the Mayor of London's transport body, Transport for London (TfL). Upon appointment in 2000, the new Mayor of London, Ken Livingstone did not have the power to improve Tube service. Instead, investment was directed to increasing the number of, and the frequency of London's bus routes - assisted by income from the congestion charge. 

Ridership subsequently rose rapidly, with 19% growth in passengers between 1999/00 to 2002/03, with ridership was at levels last seen in the late 1960s. Between 2000 and 2006, ridership growth was at 40% in London, while ridership in the rest of the country fell by 6%. The bus fleet grew to cope with demand, from around 5,500 buses to over 8,000. Traffic speeds across London improved, and levels of air pollution in central London decreased.

Vehicles 

, the London Buses fleet total of 8,795 buses includes 3,854 hybrid buses, 785 battery electric buses, and 22 hydrogen fuel cell buses. The zero emission fleet is the second largest in Europe, behind Moscow. All buses have been low-floor and accessible since 2006, one of the first major cities in the world to achieve this. 

The various bus operators operate a wide variety of vehicles, about the only immediately obvious common feature being their use of a largely red livery (mandatory since 1997). For each bus route, London Buses sets a specification for buses to be used, with the choice of particular vehicle that meets the specification left up to the operator. Particular examples of London Buses specification include the use of separate exit doors (increasingly unusual on buses in the United Kingdom outside London) and, on double-deckers, the use of a straight staircase. Additionally, London Buses has previously specified that vehicles operating in London use traditional printed roller destination blinds, whereas in most other parts of the country, electronic dot matrix or LED displays are the norm on new buses.

History 
From the early days of motor bus operation by the London General Omnibus Company (LGOC) in the 1900s (decade) until the 1960s, London went its own way, designing its own vehicles specially for London use rather than using the bus manufacturers' standard products used elsewhere. The Associated Equipment Company (AEC) was created as a subsidiary of the LGOC in 1912 to build buses and other equipment for its parent company, and continued in the ownership of LGOC and its successors until 1962. Many of London's local service buses over this period were built by AEC, although other manufacturers also built buses to London designs, or modified their own designs for use in London.

The last bus specifically designed for London was the AEC Routemaster, built between 1956 and 1968. Since then, buses built for London's local services have all been variants of models built for general use elsewhere, although bus manufacturers would routinely offer a 'London specification' to meet specific London requirements. Some manufacturers even went so far as to build new models with London in mind such as the Daimler Fleetline and Leyland Titan.

London did see the introduction of several of the newly emerging minibus and midibus models in the 1980s and 1990s, in a bid to up the frequency on routes, although the use of these buses dropped off to the level of niche operation on routes not suitable for full size buses.

Introduction of low floor buses 
London was one of the earliest major users of low-floor buses, with the first low-floor single decker vehicles entering service in 1993 and the first low-floor double decker vehicles entering service in 1998. From 2002, the mainstay of the fleet, double-decker buses, were augmented with a fleet of articulated buses, rising to a peak fleet size of 393 Mercedes-Benz Citaros. These were introduced to help replace the (high-floor) AEC Routemaster, as well as to cope with an increased capacity. Following withdrawal of older, high floor vehicles, the bus fleet became fully accessible at the end of 2005, 10 years ahead of the national requirement.

New Routemaster and bendy bus withdrawal 

In the 2008 London mayoral election campaign, prospective mayor Boris Johnson made several commitments to change the London Buses vehicle policy, namely to introduce a new Routemaster, and remove the bendy buses. Johnson was elected to office on 4 May 2008, and on 4 July 2008 Transport for London announced the New Bus for London Competition, in which conceptual and detailed design proposals would be sought for a new hybrid Routemaster, with development of a design that could be put into production hoped for completion by 2012 (the expected date of the next mayoral election).

In August 2008, the Commissioner of Transport for London Peter Hendy announced that the withdrawal of the bendy buses would take place, starting in 2009. To reduce additional costs to TfL, the articulated buses would be withdrawn as their 5-year operating contracts came up for renewal, with the replacement buses being decided by operators. Options for replacement would not preclude such measures as tri-axle buses. However, research by London TravelWatch in 2008 indicated that replacing articulated buses with double decker models would be more expensive, as additional vehicles would be required to maintain overall route capacity (capacity of 85 per bus versus 120).

The first buses to be withdrawn would be the Red Arrow fleet on routes 507 and 521 in May 2009. The last were withdrawn on 9 December 2011.

In May 2010, Mayor of London Boris Johnson unveiled the design of the New Routemaster, the proposed replacement for the Routemaster as an iconic standard bus for exclusive use in London. The buses, designed by Heatherwick Studio and built by Wrightbus feature two staircases, three doors and an open platform allowing passengers to hop on and off, and commenced operating in 2012. In December 2011 the British car magazine Autocar praised the New Routemaster in a road test, rating it ahead of contemporary and historic buses.

However, in December 2016 the new Mayor of London Sadiq Khan decided that no more orders would be placed for the bus after only 1,000 of Johnson's envisaged fleet of 2,000 had been procured. In 2020 Transport for London announced that the New Routemasters would be converted so passengers only enter by the front door, with the middle and rear doors becoming exit-only. This was done to reduce fare evasion, which had been double that of other London buses.

Transition to zero emission bus fleet 

Since the early 1990s, efforts have been underway to reduce the emissions of the bus fleet. Early work involved replacing older buses like the AEC Routemaster and fitting particulate filters to exhausts. 

In the 2000s, hybrid and hydrogen fuel cell buses were trialed - and the first hybrid buses entered service in 2006. It was originally intended that every bus introduced into service after 2012 would be a hybrid, but this requirement was later dropped. Battery electric buses first entered service in 2014, and double decker hydrogen fuel buses were introduced in 2021. London now has the 2nd largest bus fleet in Europe with over 800 battery electric and hydrogen fuel cell buses in service.

In 2021, it was announced that all buses in the fleet meet or exceed Euro VI emission standards, following the phasing out of older buses, the retrofitting of diesel vehicles and the introduction of new hybrid & electric buses. The Mayor of London is currently aiming for a zero emission bus fleet by 2037. From the autumn of 2020, all new single deck buses entering the fleet are either electric or hydrogen zero emission buses.

Operation

Local buses

Most local buses within London form a network managed by London Buses, an arm of Transport for London. Services are operated by private sector companies under contract to London Buses. With the introduction of the London congestion charge in central London and because at peak times the Underground is operating at maximum capacity, many bus service improvements have been undertaken, and central bus services are currently enjoying something of a resurgence.

Although the rear-entrance double-deck AEC Routemaster is the archetypal London bus, they were withdrawn in the early 2000s owing to their age, their inability to comply with disability legislation or accept wheelchairs or pushchairs, and their requirement for a two-person crew.

All other local bus services are now operated by modern low-floor buses, which may be single-deck or double-deck. Most buses operating in London have two sets of doors, and passengers board the bus using the front door and alight using the rear door, whilst some buses on less busy routes have only one door. Since 2006, all buses are low-floor and accessible, accepting passengers in wheelchairs and other mobility impaired passengers.

Following the privatisation of London bus services in the 1990s, the operating contracts for local buses in London are subject to a system of competitive tender. A wide range of companies now operate bus routes across London. Many services have been contracted out to leading transport groups such as Abellio, Arriva, ComfortDelGro, Go-Ahead Group, RATP Group, Stagecoach and Transit Systems. Connex, FirstGroup, National Express and Transdev previously operated services in London.

Limited stop / Express routes 
A small number of bus routes (namely routes 607, X26, X68 and X140) run a daily "limited-stop" service, travelling a long distance but serving few stops in its route.

Other bus services 
Some local bus routes in the outer areas of London cross the London boundary. London Buses services that cross the boundary have standard red buses, and charge London fares for the whole length. Buses from outside London that cross into London are in their operators' own colour schemes, and may not accept the London fares even within the boundary.

Privately run bus services may also be operated independently of the regulated London bus network, but still require a permit from TfL. This permit applies to any service which has a stop in London and another within 15 miles of Greater London, such as commuter coaches, school buses and supermarket shuttle buses.

Night buses
Night buses began running as early as 1913, and they form part of the London Buses network. For many years until 1961, the night routes were numbered from around 280 to 299. But the imminent withdrawal of trolleybuses meant that numbers between 1 and 299 were in short supply. The 280+ route numbers were freed by giving night bus routes a prefix N for the first time. For example, while route 9 travels from Aldwych to Hammersmith, route N9 continues a further 16 miles (26 km) from Hammersmith to Heathrow Terminal 5.

There are also 24-hour routes, which run throughout the day and night. These do not have distinguishing numbers. Some of these only run at night during weekends, whereas others run throughout the week.

Heritage routes

Following the withdrawal of rear-entrance double-deck AEC Routemaster from all regular service routes in 2005, a small fleet was retained to operate on heritage routes. As the AEC Routemaster buses were not accessible to passengers in wheelchairs and other mobility impaired passengers, the heritage route was operated as a short-working of a regular service route bearing the same route number, thus ensuring that passengers unable to board the heritage buses are offered equivalent alternative transport arrangements.

Initially running on route 9 and route 15, Route 9H was withdrawn on 26 July 2014. In 2019, the remaining heritage route 15 was cut back to a seasonal service, running on weekends and bank holidays through the summer. In 2021, TfL announced that the heritage route would not return following the COVID-19 pandemic.

In 2022, a private operator started operating 'Route A', a tourist focused heritage route between Piccadilly Circus and London Waterloo using AEC Routemaster buses. Unlike previous heritage routes, a higher fare is charged.

Tour buses

A common sight in central London are tour buses, the majority being open-top buses. These are double-decker buses with a fully or partially open upper deck, which provide tourist services with either live or recorded commentary. Most of these services allow passengers to embark and disembark at any of the company's stops, continuing their journey on a later bus.

There are several competing operators of such services which do not form part of the London Buses network and do not issue or accept London Buses tickets, although at least one paints its buses in the same red as London's local buses.

Other tours use coaches and generally need to be booked in advance through travel agents.

Long distance coaches

Long-distance coaches link London with the rest of the United Kingdom and with other cities across the European mainland. Many domestic services are run by National Express, with international services mainly provided by Flixbus and Eurolines. National Express' predominantly white vehicles are common on the roads of central London, on their way to and from their terminus at Victoria Coach Station.

In 2006, competition for long-distance traffic was introduced by Megabus, a subsidiary of the large UK bus operating company Stagecoach. This company operates cheap services aimed at students and the like, which must be booked in advance on the internet.

Other coach services link London to medium-distance destinations, and unlike National Express or Megabus provide walk-on fares. Good examples of this are the Green Line services to the Home Counties, mainly operated by Arriva, the service to the city of Oxford, where Stagecoach's frequent Oxford Tube service competes with Go-Ahead's similar Oxford Express service, and the many commuter services to medium-distance destinations operated by individual coach companies during peak times.

Airport buses

National Express is also the principal airport bus operator, serving Heathrow, Gatwick and Stansted with its National Express Airport brand. Unlike their longer distance cousins, these are walk-on services, which serve stops throughout central London rather than running to Victoria Coach Station.

Bus and coach stations 

There are around 50 bus and coach stations across London, located at transport interchanges, town centres and other major destinations such as shopping centres and hospitals. The busiest coach station in London is Victoria Coach Station, which serves around 14 million passengers a year. Cromwell Road bus station in Kingston upon Thames is the largest London Buses bus station, with 17 bus stands.

Major accidents and incidents

 October 1940: LT 669, operating on route 88, was abandoned by its passengers and crew on Balham High Road seconds before a bomb fell, creating a huge crater into which the bus rolled. It was hauled out of the crater two weeks later.
 13 June 1957: RTL 780, operating on route 7 collided with a queue of people at a bus stop in Oxford Street, resulting in eight deaths. The driver had collapsed with heat exhaustion.
 18 February 1996: An explosive device detonated prematurely on a route 171 Catford to Holborn double-decker bus, operated by London Central, in Aldwych. The bomb killed Edward O'Brien, the IRA terrorist transporting the device, and injuring eight others including the driver. The force ripped the bus apart, destroying its front.
 7 July 2005: An explosion occurred as part of a coordinated attack on London on a route 30 Hackney Wick to Marble Arch double-decker bus, operated by Stagecoach London, in Tavistock Square. The force ripped the roof off the top deck and destroyed the back of the bus, killing thirteen passengers and the suicide bomber.
 21 July 2005: A suicide bomber attempted to explode a bomb as part of a second coordinated attack on London on a route 26 Waterloo station to Hackney Wick double-decker bus, operated by Stagecoach Group, in Bethnal Green. The device failed to detonate properly and there were no injuries.
 20 December 2013: 30 people were injured, and two critically, after a double-decker on route 59 crashed into a tree while swerving to avoid hitting a car in Kennington.
 4 June 2014: 10 people on a night route N38 bus in Clapton were injured after the bus was smashed into by a passenger car racing at speeds of around 100 mph. The driver of the car lost his life and his front-seat passenger was critically injured.
 18 July 2015: The roof of a double-decker on route 197 in Norwood was ripped off under a bridge, with seven people injured.
 15 May 2016: 17 people including four children were wounded when a double-decker bus operating on route 18 crashed into a shop in the town centre of Harlesden.
 31 October 2019: A major road accident involving the route R11, route 358 and a car in Orpington, with one of the bus drivers losing his life and 15 others wounded.
 25 January 2022: 19 people were injured after a double-decker bus operating on route 212 crashed into a shop in Highams Park.

Media 

A revamped London bus has been used to promote the work of British artist Sir Peter Blake. An anthropomorphic Routemaster named Topper Deckington III is a fictional character in the Pixar movie Cars 2.

Facts and figures
Note that these figures only take Transport for London services into consideration, and exclude school and other bus services.

, the London bus fleet total of 8,795 buses includes 3,854 hybrid buses, 785 battery electric buses, and 22 hydrogen fuel cell buses.

Route 18, running between Sudbury and Euston bus station is the busiest bus route. The service carried over 16.6 million passengers in 2018/19. The next busiest routes (over 10 million) are: 25, 29, 140, 149, 243, 207, 86, 36, 38, 5, 279, 53, 109, 141 and 43.

Route U9 has the highest mean observed speed of daytime routes, at 18.8 mph. The slowest was 15H at 3.8 mph.

Route X26, running from Croydon to Heathrow Airport, is the longest daytime route at 24 miles. The next longest are routes 166, 358 and 465 (all 17 miles), 111 and 246 (16 miles) and 492 (15 miles).

References

Bibliography
Marshall, Prince Wheels of London; The story of London's street transport. The Sunday Times Magazine, 1972. .

External links